Dallsiphona is a genus of land snails with an operculum, terrestrial gastropod mollusks in the family Pomatiidae.

Species 
Species within the genus Dallsiphona include:
Dallsiphona dalli (Torre & Henderson , 1920)

References 

Pomatiidae